Gournay-sur-Marne (literally Gournay on Marne) is a commune in the eastern suburbs of Paris, France in the Seine-Saint-Denis department.

Population

Heraldry

Transport
Gournay-sur-Marne is served by no station of the Paris Métro, RER, or suburban rail network. The closest station to Gournay-sur-Marne is Chelles – Gournay station on Paris RER line E and on the Transilien Paris – Est suburban rail line. This station is located in the neighboring commune of Chelles,  from the town center of Gournay-sur-Marne.

Education
The commune has two schools, École maternelle du château, and École élémentaire "Les pâquerettes".

See also
Communes of the Seine-Saint-Denis department

References

External links

  Home page

Communes of Seine-Saint-Denis